Volcano Adventure is a 1956 children's book by the Canadian-born American author Willard Price featuring his "Adventure" series characters, Hal and Roger Hunt. It depicts a journey to several of the world's most dangerous volcanoes. The story involves the brothers meeting a volcanologist and deals with volcanology, perhaps one of the more scientific of Price's novels.

Legacy 
In 2013, British adventurer Bear Grylls listed Volcano Adventure has one of his favourite adventure stories. He wrote: "Hal and Roger Hunt have a fantastic never-say-die attitude, and show great problem-solving skills as they save the lives of people from deadly volcanic disasters. It's very well researched too, and most of the events are based upon real-life volcanic disasters."

References 

1956 American novels
Novels by Willard Price
Jonathan Cape books
1956 children's books